Meadow Park is a football stadium in Hempsted, Gloucester. It has been home to Gloucester City A.F.C. from 1986 to 2007. It was destroyed by flooding in 2007 and was rebuilt, with the first game being held in September 2020.

History
Meadow Park was not the first home of Gloucester City A.F.C., their previous venue was Horton Road Stadium from 1964 to 1986. The club officially moved to Meadow Park in 1986. In 1990, the stadium flooded after severe snowfall. It was submerged under 4 feet of water when the snow melted, which meant the ground couldn't be used for over a month. The ground was out of commission for more than 6 weeks, after an environmental health inspection ruled that the ground wasn't fit for use due to the contamination of the water.

The entire pitch was swamped with the clubhouse, kitchen facilities, changing rooms and shop all being flooded. Due to previous flooding incidents, the club had been unable to obtain insurance so was now faced with a large clean-up bill. The club started a fund to pay for this appealing to fans for donations. Meadow Park had been in ruin since this date, with the club playing at various other grounds instead.

New Meadow Park Stadium

In 2007, Gloucester City Council established a "Football Task and Finish Group" who evaluated several sites in the city before deciding that building a new stadium at Meadow Park was the best viable solution. In 2011, a planning application for a new stadium and industrial land was submitted but this was refused by Gloucester City Council in 2013.

In 2014, scaled down plans for a 4,000 capacity stadium with a 1,000 seat stand were submitted and approved by the council, albeit with 45 additional conditions imposed by the council. The aim was to have it built within 12 to 18 months however this never went ahead. In September 2016, variations to address the many conditions of the original planning permission were approved. These included allowing building work to start before the footpath was widened and bicycle parking was built. However, there was still little progress made on the actual building of the stadium other than ground preparation work.

On 14 September 2018, a telephone mast obstructing the ground was taken down. In October 2018, scaled down plans for a new 3,000 seater stadium were revealed as the original plan became too expensive to fund. This included two 250-seater stands, a covered terrace for 800 fans and plans to repair the existing Arriva House and Clubhouse. It also proposed to move the existing open terrace stand currently residing at Evesham, back to Meadow Park. In January 2019, the plans were submitted to the council to include two 350-seater stands. On 2 May 2019, planning permission was granted for the amended plans with the proposed stadium having a capacity of 4,000, despite concerns voiced by Gloucestershire Constabulary regarding emergency vehicle access to the site. The club moved to secure funding through The Football Stadia Improvement Fund. In May 2019, the Football Association and National League  granted the club permission to switch venues at any point in the 2019–20 season as soon as the new stadium is ready.

Final conditions for access to the Football Stadia Improvement Fund were agreed in November 2019, with construction of the new stadium commencing on 6 January 2020. To safeguard the renovated stadium from flooding in the future, the building works included raising the surface level of the pitch, stands and clubhouse 3.5 metres from the level of the old Meadow Park. The first game at the new stadium was held in September 2020, and Gloucester City A.F.C. resumed playing their home games at Meadow Park in December 2020.

TigerTurf Stadium

In March 2022, the club signed a three-year naming rights sponsorship deal with TigerTurf and the stadium was renamed the TigerTurf Stadium until the end of the 2024-25 National League season.

Transport
The nearest train station to New Meadow Park is in Gloucester City Centre about one mile away. You can catch the local regular Stagecoach bus route 8 to Kingsway, this will drop you off by Sainsbury's and The High Orchard pub across the road from the stadium.

References

External links
Gloucester City A.F.C.
History of Gloucester City A.F.C.

Gloucester City A.F.C.
Sports venues in Gloucester
Football venues in Gloucestershire
Proposed football venues in England
Sports venues completed in 1964
Sports venues completed in 2020
Sports venues demolished in 2018
Buildings and structures in Gloucester